Viggja is a village in the municipality of Skaun in Trøndelag county, Norway.

References

Skaun
Villages in Trøndelag